Warnertown is a settlement in South Australia. It lies on the Augusta Highway between Crystal Brook and Port Pirie. Warnertown is a service centre which is close to Port Pirie but avoids leaving the highway. As such, Warnertown's businesses on the main road consist of a hotel / public bar, bakery, service station and mechanical workshop.

References

Towns in South Australia